Pankracije Barać (born November 4, 1981) is a Croatian former professional basketball player. He played at the guard positions.

References

External links
 Profile at eurobasket.com 
 Profile at realGM 
 Profile at euroleague

Living people
1981 births
Croatian men's basketball players
CSU Asesoft Ploiești players
KK Cibona players
KK Zadar players
KK Zagreb players
Point guards
Sportspeople from Pula
Croatian expatriate basketball people in Romania
Croatian expatriate basketball people in Belgium
KK Zrinjevac players
Spirou Charleroi players
BC Kyiv players
BBC Monthey players
KK Jazine Arbanasi players
Croatian expatriate basketball people in Ukraine
Croatian expatriate basketball people in Switzerland